Holika, also known as Simhika, is an asuri in Hinduism. She is the sister of the asura-kings Hiranyakashipu and Hiranyaksha, and the paternal aunt   of Prahlada.

The legend of Holika Dahan (Holika's burning) signifies the triumph of righteousness over sin. Holika is associated with the annual bonfire on the night before Holi, the festival of colours.

Legend

According to the Puranas, a king named Hiranyakashipu, like many asuras, wished to be immortal. To fulfill this desire, he performed the required tapas until he was granted a boon by Brahma. The boon granted Hiranyakashipu five of his desires: that he would not die at the hands of any being created by Brahma, that he would not perish inside or outside, by day or night, by any weapon, on the earth or in the sky, by men or beasts, devas or asuras, that he be unequalled, that he possess undiminishing power, and that he be the one ruler of all creation. His wish granted, Hiranyakashipu felt invincible, and conquered the three worlds, assuming the throne of Indra. He punished and killed anyone all those who objected to his supremacy. His son Prahlada, raised a Vaishnava, refused to worship his father as a deity. He continued believing in and worshipping Bhagawan Vishnu.

This infuriated Hiranyakashipu, and he made various attempts to kill Prahlada. During one attempt on Prahlada's life, King Hiranyakashipu's sister, Holika, offered her help. According to the Vishnu Purana, Holika told her brother that due to a boon she had received, she was invulnerable to fire. Arrangements were made to have Prahlada sit upon the lap of his aunt, atop a burning pyre. However, as Prahlada chanted the name of Vishnu, he escaped unscathed, while Holika was incinerated. 

In a variation of this Puranic legend, Hiranyakashipu had Holika don her scarf or her fireproof garment, so that his son may perish, and she may be protected atop the pyre. However, as the fire roared, the garment flew from Holika and covered Prahlada. Holika burnt to death, and Prahlada came out unharmed.

Vishnu appeared in the form of Narasimha (a half-human and half-lion avatara, one not created by Brahma), at dusk (neither day nor night), took Hiranyakashipu to his dwelling's threshold (neither indoors nor outdoors), placed him upon his lap (neither land, water, nor air), and then slew the king with his claws (not a weapon). In this manner, the comprehensive boon of Hiranyakashipu was no longer useful. Prahlada and the races of the three worlds were thus set free from the tyranny of Hiranyakashipu, and cosmic order was restored.

Holika Dahan

According to various Hindu traditions, Holika Dahana, commonly rendered Holika Dahan in Indo-Aryan languages, celebrates the death of Holika and the salvation of Prahlada. The night before Holi, pyres are burnt in North India, to commemorate this legend. This date coincides with the festival of Kama Dahanam in South India, regarded to be the date Shiva burnt Kamadeva to ashes.

References

External links
 Origins of Holi at BBC.

Daityas
Holi

sv:Holika